A kitewing is a wing-shaped sail designed to use wind power to provide speed and lift to riders in outdoor environments. It can be used on a number of different surfaces when paired with the appropriate vehicle, including skis, snowboards, and roller skates.

Description

A kitewing differs from a sports kite or traction kite in that a kitewing does not have a separate control system (see kite control systems). Instead, a kitewing is held directly in the hands of the user, which provides control, stability and depower. In addition, a kitewing does not have lines to tangle, and can be manoeuvred easily to perform a wide variety of tricks, turns and fast speeds.
 
This additional control also makes a kitewing safer to use. The instant depower reduces the risk of riders being overrun in strong gusts, and the proximity of the kitewing to the rider makes it safer for other users of the space as there is no risk of injury from kite lines.
 
A Kitewing can be used in varied wind ranges. For initial learning only a small space and low wind speeds are required to allow riders to familiarise themselves with the Kitewing assembly and handling characteristics.
 
In the correct wind conditions an experienced rider can reach speeds up to 90 km/hour. Some very experienced riders can perform controlled jumps of up to 500 meters (on declining terrain) or perform jump turns and other advanced manoeuvres.

Types and sizes

A small kitewing can provide improved manoeuvrability and increased speed in strong  wind conditions. It is also better suited to learning. A larger version is preferable for use on sand, grass or other surfaces with high friction.

Safety

A Kitewing rider can sustain injuries from a fall so the appropriate safety gear should be worn depending on the terrain.
It is important to remember that a kitewing should always be used with caution, in clear safe areas, and with the proper safety equipment. Typical safety equipment are helmets and safety leash especially designed for kitewing riders. On land ice or snow, serious riders use a full set of knee and elbow pads, wrist guards and a back harness as well.

Kitesurfing